George Thomas Conway III (born September 2, 1963) is an American lawyer and activist. Conway was considered by President Donald Trump for the position of Solicitor General of the United States, and a post as an assistant attorney general heading the Civil Division at the United States Department of Justice, but withdrew himself from consideration. 

In 2018, Conway emerged as a vocal Trump critic, even though his wife, Kellyanne Conway, worked for Trump from 2016 to 2020. During the 2020 presidential election, Conway was involved with the Lincoln Project, a coalition of former Republicans dedicated to defeating Trump. 

Conway successfully argued the 2010 case Morrison v. National Australia Bank before the Supreme Court of the United States.

Early life and education
George Conway's father, an electrical engineer, worked for defense contractor Raytheon. His mother was an organic chemist from the Philippines. 

Conway grew up outside of Boston and graduated from Marlborough High School in Marlborough, Massachusetts. In 1984, Conway graduated from Harvard College magna cum laude with a Bachelor of Arts in biochemistry, where William A. Haseltine served as his faculty advisor. Three years later, he obtained his Juris Doctor from Yale Law School, where he was an editor of the Yale Law Journal and president of the school's chapter of the Federalist Society.

Career

Legal career
In 1987 and 1988, Conway served as a law clerk to Judge Ralph K. Winter Jr. of the U.S. Court of Appeals for the Second Circuit. In September 1988, Conway joined the law firm of Wachtell, Lipton, Rosen & Katz. He was named a partner of the firm in the Litigation Department in January 1994 at a million dollars a year. Conway's practice focused on litigation involving securities, mergers and acquisitions, contracts, and antitrust. In 2016, Wachtell Lipton reported $5.8 million in profits per partner.

Conway agreed to work unpaid as one of the attorneys who represented Paula Jones in her lawsuit against U.S. president Bill Clinton. During the representation of Jones, Conway worked closely with Ann Coulter and Matt Drudge.

On March 29, 2010, Conway argued the securities case of Morrison v. National Australia Bank before the U.S. Supreme Court. Conway won the case, which was decided by an 8–0 vote; the opinion was written by Justice Antonin Scalia.

Conway has been considered for some United States Department of Justice posts. In January 2017, he was considered for the post of Solicitor General. The job eventually went to Noel Francisco. On March 17, 2017, it was reported that he would be nominated to run the United States Department of Justice Civil Division. However, on June 2, 2017, Conway announced that he declined to pursue the post. On November 16, 2018, Conway stated that a reason he did not join the Trump administration was because it was "like a shitshow in a dumpster fire".

Anti-Trump activism
On November 9, 2018, Conway and Neal Katyal wrote an op-ed in The New York Times challenging the constitutionality of Trump's appointment of Matthew Whitaker as acting attorney general following the termination of Jeff Sessions. Trump relied on the Federal Vacancies Reform Act of 1998 (FVRA), which allows the president to make interim appointments, to appoint Whitaker. Conway and Katyal argued that it was a mistake to try to use the FVRA to override the explicit wording of the Constitution, which requires Senate approval of all appointees who answer directly to the president.

In November 2018, Conway organized a group called Checks and Balances. The group was composed of more than a dozen members of the conservative-libertarian Federalist Society, which had been instrumental in selecting candidates for the Trump administration to appoint to federal courts. The New York Times reported that the group was "urging their fellow conservatives to speak up about what they say are the Trump administration's betrayals of bedrock legal norms".

Conway is a founding member and advisor of the Lincoln Project, a conservative Super PAC formed in December 2019 and dedicated to "Defeat President Trump and Trumpism at the ballot box". Its detailed aim is "persuading enough disaffected conservatives, Republicans and Republican-leaning independents in swing states and districts to help ensure a victory in the Electoral College, and congressional majorities that don't enable or abet Mr. Trump's violations of the Constitution". The group released its first video on January 9, 2020; called "The MAGA Church"; it warns evangelicals to beware of false prophets. On August 23, 2020, he announced that he would be taking a leave from the Lincoln Project in order to devote more time to his family. Kellyanne Conway, his wife, announced her departure from the White House the same day as well. In 2021, Conway said that the Lincoln Project should shut down considering revelations that some of its leadership ignored warnings that another founder was harassing young men, including interns.

Following the first impeachment of Donald Trump, Conway opined in The Washington Post that if the relevant witnesses are not allowed to testify during the Senate Trump impeachment trial, Trump's defenders will be negatively affected by "the very evidence they sought to suppress". Upon Senator Mitch McConnell's refusal to subpoena John Bolton in a Senate impeachment trial, Conway and Neal K. Katyal opined in The New York Times, "There is only one possible explanation for this behavior: [McConnell] is afraid of the truth. Otherwise, what argument can there be for refusing to hear from a central witness like Mr. Bolton, who other witnesses have indicated was exceptionally concerned about the suspension of military aid to Ukraine?"

Personal life
In the late 1990s Conway dated conservative pundit Laura Ingraham. After he saw Kellyanne Fitzpatrick on the cover of a society magazine, he asked Ann Coulter for an introduction, and began dating Fitzpatrick. George and Kellyanne married in 2001. They have four children and live in Washington, D.C. Prior to Trump's presidency, the family lived in Closter, New Jersey.

In 2020, Conway's daughter, Claudia Conway, made a series of anti-Trump comments on TikTok. On July 2, she said that her father approved of utilizing her right to free speech and voicing her own opinions.

Since 2018, Conway's stated political positions have often been contrary to those taken by his wife on behalf of the Trump administration. His published legal interpretations of Trump's actions differ from his wife's positions, and on Twitter he has been critical of Trump on a personal level. In March 2019, Trump responded to Conway's attacks by calling him a "stone cold LOSER & husband from hell" on Twitter. Kellyanne defended Trump's comments in an interview, saying that Trump was "a counterpuncher" and was free to respond when he is attacked.

In March 2023, George and Kellyanne announced that they were divorcing after 22 years of marriage.

Selected publications

References

External links
 George T. Conway III cases at the U.S. Supreme Court. Oyez.com
 

1963 births
Living people
People from Marlborough, Massachusetts
Lawyers from Boston
Lawyers from Washington, D.C.
20th-century American lawyers
21st-century American lawyers
Federalist Society members
Harvard College alumni
Yale Law School alumni
Criticism of Donald Trump
American people of Filipino descent
Massachusetts Republicans
Wachtell, Lipton, Rosen & Katz people